Donald E. Burkhart Jr. (born September 4, 1948) is an American politician and a Republican member of the Wyoming House of Representatives representing District 15 since January 11, 2011.

Education
Burkhart earned his BS in physics from John Carroll University.

Elections
2012 Burkhart and former Representative George Bagby were both unopposed for their August 21, 2012 primaries, setting up a rematch; Burkhart won the November 6, 2012 General election with 1,717 votes (51.1%) against Representative Bagby.
2010 To challenge incumbent Democratic Representative George Bagby for the District 15 seat, Burkhart won the August 17, 2010 Republican Primary with 497 votes (47.7%), and won the November 2, 2010 General election by 11 votes with 1,153 votes (49.4%) against Representative Bagby, who had held the seat since 2003.

References

External links
Official page at the Wyoming Legislature
Campaign site
 

21st-century American politicians
1948 births
John Carroll University alumni
Living people
Republican Party members of the Wyoming House of Representatives
People from Rawlins, Wyoming
Place of birth missing (living people)